The 2008 Cleveland Browns season was the team's 60th season as a professional sports franchise and its 56th season as a member of the National Football League (NFL). The Browns finished with a 4–12 record and failed to qualify for the playoffs.  The season marked Romeo Crennel's fourth (and what would be final) year as head coach of the Browns. Cleveland played all of their home games at Cleveland Browns Stadium in Cleveland, Ohio. To end the 2008 season, the Browns offense failed to score a touchdown for 25 consecutive quarters and were shut out in their final two games. The Cleveland Browns failed to make the playoffs for the sixth consecutive season.

Off-season

Coaching staff changes
On January 7, the Browns signed offensive coordinator Rob Chudzinski to a two-year contract extension, effectively allowing the coach to remain in Cleveland through the 2011 season. Chudzinski declined an opportunity to interview for the vacant head coach position of the Baltimore Ravens to remain in Cleveland.

On January 11, it was announced by Crennel that the team had fired defensive coordinator Todd Grantham, and that a replacement would be announced soon. Grantham's firing comes just months after signing a two-year contract extension. The next day, it was announced that Mel Tucker, defensive backs coach for the Browns, was given the job. After spending three years on the Browns defensive coaching staff, Cory Undlin was promoted to defensive backs coach to replace Tucker.

On January 29, the team announced that it had re-signed head coach Romeo Crennel to a two-year contract extension. General manager Phil Savage stated that Crennel did not ask for an extension, but rather that the team felt that it was the proper thing to do for the head coach.

Free agents

Signings

Releases

2008 NFL Draft
The Browns did not have a selection in the first three rounds.

Coaching Staff

Final roster

Preseason

Schedule

Regular season

Schedule

Note: Intra-divisional opponents are in bold text.

Standings

7-9

Regular season week-by-week results

Week 1: vs. Dallas Cowboys 

The Browns began their 2008 campaign at home against the defending NFC East champion Dallas Cowboys.  In the first quarter, Cleveland trailed early as Cowboys RB Marion Barber got a 1-yard TD run.  In the second quarter, the Browns responded with QB Derek Anderson completing a 2-yard TD pass to TE Kellen Winslow.  Dallas would respond with QB Tony Romo completing a 35-yard TD pass to WR Terrell Owens, along with another 1-yard TD run from Barber.  In the third quarter, Cleveland's defensive struggles continued as RB Felix Jones got an 11-yard TD run.  In the fourth quarter, the Browns tried to rally, yet all they could come up with was a 34-yard field goal from kicker Phil Dawson.

With the loss, Cleveland began its season at 0–1.

Week 2: vs. Pittsburgh Steelers 

Hoping to rebound from their disappointing home loss to the Cowboys, the Browns stayed at home for the first of five primetime games with a Week 2 AFC North duel against their hated rival, the Pittsburgh Steelers, in very high winds due to the remnants of Hurricane Ike. After a scoreless first quarter, Cleveland trailed as Steelers QB Ben Roethlisberger completed an 11-yard TD pass to WR Hines Ward. In the third quarter, Pittsburgh increased its lead with kicker Jeff Reed getting a 48-yard field goal.  Afterwards, the Browns got on the board with kicker Phil Dawson getting a 31-yard field goal.  In the fourth quarter, Cleveland tried to rally, but the only thing that came out of it was Dawson's 38-yard field goal.

With their 10th-straight loss to Pittsburgh, the Browns fell to 0–2.

This would be the Browns' last appearance on Sunday Night Football until 2019.

Week 3: at Baltimore Ravens 

Trying to snap their two-game losing streak, the Browns flew to M&T Bank Stadium for a Week 3 AFC North duel with the Baltimore Ravens.  After a scoreless first quarter, Cleveland got on the board with QB Derek Anderson completing a 19-yard TD pass to RB Jerome Harrison.  The Ravens would respond with RB Willis McGahee getting a yard TD run.  The Browns would close out the half with kicker Phil Dawson hitting a 38-yard field goal.

In the third quarter, Baltimore took control as RB Le'Ron McClain scored on a 1-yard TD run, safety Ed Reed returned an interception 32 yards for a touchdown, and McClain getting another 1-yard TD run.

With the loss, the Browns fell to 0–3.

Week 4: at Cincinnati Bengals 

Still searching for their first win of the year, the Browns flew to Paul Brown Stadium for a Week 4 AFC North duel with the Cincinnati Bengals in Round 1 of 2008's Battle of Ohio.  In the first quarter, Cleveland drew first blood as kicker Phil Dawson got a 25-yard field goal.  In the second quarter, the Bengals responded with kicker Shayne Graham getting a 42-yard and a 45-yard field goal.  After a scoreless third quarter, the Browns began the fourth quarter with QB Derek Anderson completing a 4-yard TD pass to WR Braylon Edwards and RB Jamal Lewis getting a 1-yard TD run.  Cincinnati would answer with QB Ryan Fitzpatrick completing a 4-yard TD pass to WR Chad Ochocinco (with a failed 2-point conversion), yet Cleveland pulled away with Dawson nailing a 29-yard field goal.

With their first win of the season, the Browns' record improved to 1–3.

Week 5: Bye Week
The Browns entered their bye week with a record of 1–3.  The team used the bye week to rest and allow injured players to recover.  The Browns also used the extra week to better prepare for their Week 6 opponent:  the defending champion New York Giants.

Winslow's Staph Infection
Browns' tight end Kellen Winslow II was hospitalized on October 9 with an undisclosed illness (later revealed to be a staph infection).  Winslow spent four nights in the hospital and did not play in the Browns' game against the Giants.   Citing Winslow's privacy, the Browns did not comment on his illness.

Week 6: vs. New York Giants 

Coming off their bye week, the Browns went home, donned their throwback uniforms, and played a crucial Week 6 interconference duel with the defending Super Bowl champions, the New York Giants, on Monday Night Football. Also Tom Coughlin’s first game in Cleveland since the 2001 Bottlegate incident when he was with the Jaguars.

In the first quarter, Cleveland drew first blood as kicker Phil Dawson got a 28-yard field goal.  In the second quarter, the Giants responded as RB Brandon Jacobs had a touchdown run.  The Browns would answer with two touchdowns:  A run by RB Jamal Lewis and with QB Derek Anderson pass to TE Darnell Dinkins.  New York closed out the half with QB Eli Manning completing a TD pass to WR Plaxico Burress.

In the third quarter, Cleveland added onto its lead as Dawson nailed a 26-yard field goal.  The Browns pulled away in the fourth quarter with a touchdown pass from Anderson to WR Braylon Edwards, as well as an Eric Wright interception returned for a touchdown.

With the impressive win, Cleveland improved to 2–3.  This was also the Browns' first win on Monday Night Football since 1993.

Crennel Named Coach of the Week
After the Browns' victory over the Giants, head coach Romeo Crennel received NFL Coach of the Week honors for Week 6.

Week 7: at Washington Redskins 

Coming off their impressive Monday Night home win over the Giants, the Browns flew to Fedex Field for a Week 7 duel with the Washington Redskins.  After a scoreless first half, Cleveland trailed in the third quarter, as Redskins RB Clinton Portis got a 3-yard TD run.  The Browns would respond with kicker Phil Dawson nailing a 37-yard field goal.  In the fourth quarter, Washington answered with QB Jason Campbell completing an 18-yard TD pass to WR Santana Moss.  Cleveland tried to rally as QB Derek Anderson completed a 1-yard TD pass to WR/KR Josh Cribbs (along with a 2-point conversion pass to WR Braylon Edwards).  However, Dawson's game-tying 54-yard field goal attempt sailed wide right, preserving the Redskins' win.

With the loss, the Browns fell to 2–4.

Winslow Suspended
On October 21, the Browns suspended TE Kellen Winslow II for one game because of comments made after the Browns' loss to the Redskins.  Winslow said he was unhappy about the way the Browns organization treated him while he was out last week for an undisclosed illness, which has since been confirmed to be a staph infection.  He told reporters that he felt as though he was being treated like "a piece of meat," and that he was unhappy that general manager Phil Savage did not contact him while he was hospitalized.  Savage announce that Winslow was being suspended for the team's game against the Jaguars, without pay, for "conduct detrimental to the club."

Winslow planned to appeal the suspension, but the hearing was not scheduled until October 28, two days after the Jaguars game.

On October 25, the Browns rescinded Winslow's suspension.  Although he did not play the game against the Jaguars, he received his game check minus a $25,000 fine.

Week 8: at Jacksonville Jaguars 

Hoping to rebound from their last-second road loss to the Redskins, the Browns flew to Jacksonville Municipal Stadium for a Week 8 duel with the Jacksonville Jaguars. In the first quarter, Cleveland drew first blood as QB Derek Anderson completed a 3-yard TD pass to WR Donté Stallworth.  In the second quarter, the Jaguars tied the game as QB David Garrard completed a 5-yard TD pass to WR Reggie Williams.  The Browns responded with RB Jamal Lewis getting a 2-yard TD run, along with kicker Phil Dawson getting a 32-yard field goal.

In the third quarter, Jacksonville drew closer as Garrard completed an 8-yard TD pass to WR Matt Jones.  In the fourth quarter, the Jaguars tied the game as kicker Josh Scobee made a 53-yard field goal.  Afterwards, Cleveland regained the lead with Dawson nailing a 20-yard and a 42-yard field goal, with the defense fending off Jacksonville's last attempt at a comeback.

With the win, the Browns improved to 3–4.

Week 9: vs. Baltimore Ravens 

Coming off their road win over the Jaguars, the Browns went home for a Week 9 AFC North rematch with the Baltimore Ravens.  In the first quarter, Cleveland trailed early as Ravens kicker Matt Stover kicked a 41-yard field goal, along with QB Joe Flacco completing a 47-yard TD pass to WR Mark Clayton.  The Browns immediately responded with WR Josh Cribbs returning a kickoff 92 yards for a touchdown.  In the second quarter, Cleveland increased its lead with kicker Phil Dawson kicking a 23-yard field goal.  Baltimore responded with Stover making a 32-yard field goal, yet the Browns replied with Dawson's 54-yard field goal.

In the third quarter, Cleveland took the lead as QB Derek Anderson completed a 28-yard TD pass to WR Braylon Edwards and a 7-yard TD pass to RB Jason Wright.  The Ravens responded with FB Le'Ron McClain's 1-yard TD run.  In the fourth quarter, Baltimore rallied as Flacco completed a 28-yard TD pass to WR Derrick Mason, Stover kicking a 22-yard field goal, and LB Terrell Suggs returning an interception 42 yards for a touchdown.

With the loss, the Browns fell to 3–5.

Quinn Named Starter
On November 3, it was announced that quarterback Derek Anderson would be benched in favor of QB Brady Quinn for the Browns' next game against the Denver Broncos.

Week 10: vs. Denver Broncos

Hoping to rebound from their season-sweeping loss to the Ravens, the Browns stayed at home for a Week 10 Thursday night game against the Denver Broncos.  In the first quarter, Cleveland trailed early as Broncos RB Ryan Torain got a 1-yard TD run.  The Browns would respond as QB Brady Quinn, making his first career start, completed a 5-yard TD pass to TE Kellen Winslow.  In the second quarter, Cleveland took the lead as kicker Phil Dawson made a 24-yard field goal, along with Quinn hooking up with Winslow again on a 16-yard TD pass.  Denver would answer with kicker Matt Prater making a 35-yard field goal.  The Browns would close out the half with Dawson making a 52-yard field goal.

In the third quarter, Cleveland added onto its lead as Dawson got a 33-yard field goal.  The Broncos would reply with Prater making a 30-yard field.  In the fourth quarter, Denver regained the lead as QB Jay Cutler completing a 93-yard TD pass to WR Eddie Royal and a 27-yard TD pass to TE Daniel Graham.  The Browns would respond with RB Jamal Lewis getting a 1-yard TD run.  However, the Broncos replied with Cutler completing an 11-yard TD pass to WR Brandon Marshall.  Cleveland tried to come back, but Denver's defense stiffened.

With the loss, the Browns fell to 3–6, making it impossible to improve on their 10–6 record from the 2007 season.

This also marked Cleveland's eighth-straight loss to Denver.

Week 11: at Buffalo Bills

Trying to snap a two-game losing streak, the Browns flew to Ralph Wilson Stadium for a Week 11 MNF duel with the Buffalo Bills.  In the first quarter, Cleveland took advantage of early Bills miscues as kicker Phil Dawson kicked two field goals.  In the second quarter, the Browns increased their lead as Josh Cribbs scored a 2-yard TD run.  Buffalo responded with QB Trent Edwards completing an 18-yard TD pass to RB Marshawn Lynch, along with kicker Rian Lindell getting a 26-yard field goal.

In the third quarter, Cleveland answered with Dawson getting a 43-yard field goal.  The Bills would reply with Lindell making a 31-yard field goal.  In the fourth quarter, the Browns greatly answered with RB Jerome Harrison getting a 72-yard TD run.  Buffalo would immediately respond with CB Leodis McKelvin returning a kickoff 98 yards for a touchdown and would take the lead on a  1-yard TD run by Edwards.  Afterwards, the Browns regained the lead as Dawson nailed a 56-yard field goal.  Buffalo did try to make a comeback, yet Lindell's 47-yard field goal sailed wide right, preserving Cleveland's victory and preventing them from becoming the first NFL team to lose three straight games after having a lead of 13 or more points in each of them.

With the win, the Browns improved to 4–6.

Phil Savage E-Mail controversy
Browns General Manager Phil Savage received a lot of criticism when he received an e-mail from a Browns fans during the Bills game, which read the following:

You are easily the worst GM in the NFL. Chud, Crennel and Tucker should NOT have jobs. How the hell do you play prevent defense the entire game? How do you NOT use Jerome Harrison more? Why the hell would you throw the ball with 6 minutes left? This is officially a regime that is worse than Butch Davis's. By the way, just like last week – this email was written while the Browns still had the lead.

After the game, Savage promptly responded to the fan with the following:

Go root for Buffalo-f#@* you

Week 12: vs. Houston Texans

Coming off their MNF road win over the Bills, the Browns went home for a Week 12 duel with the Houston Texans.  In the first quarter, Cleveland trailed early as Texans QB Sage Rosenfels completed a 17-yard TD pass to WR Kevin Walter.  In the second quarter, Houston increased its lead as kicker Kris Brown got a 31-yard field goal.  The Browns would respond with kicker Phil Dawson getting a pair of 32-yard field goals, but the Texans answered with Brown's 31-yard field goal.  In the third quarter, Houston kept its momentum going with Brown nailing a 31-yard field goal.  Cleveland tried to rally, but Houston's defense was too much.

With the loss, the Browns fell to 4–7.

Quinn out for season
On November 25, it was announced that quarterback Brady Quinn would be out for the season due to a fractured right index finger suffered in the Browns' week 11 duel with the Buffalo Bills. Derek Anderson was announced to be the starter for their next game against the Indianapolis Colts.

Week 13: vs. Indianapolis Colts

Hoping to rebound from their loss to the Texans, the Browns stayed at home for a Week 13 duel with the Indianapolis Colts.  In the first quarter, Cleveland struck first as kicker Phil Dawson kicked a 34-yard field goal.  The Colts answered with kicker Adam Vinatieri kicking a 30-yard field goal.  In the second quarter, the Browns regained the lead as Dawson nailed a 25-yard field goal.  However, after a scoreless third quarter, Indianapolis' defense answered in the fourth quarter, as DE Robert Mathis returned a fumble 37 yards for a touchdown.  From there on out, Cleveland was unable to come back.

With the loss, the Browns stumbled to 4–8.

Anderson out for season
On December 1, it was announced that QB Derek Anderson would be done for the season following a torn MCL suffered in the loss to the Colts. Third-string QB Ken Dorsey was announced to be starting for the Browns' next game against the Tennessee Titans.

Bruce Gradkowski signed
On December 2, the Browns signed free-agent veteran QB Bruce Gradkowski to a two-year contract.  Gradkowski will serve as the backup QB under Dorsey for the Browns' next game against the Tennessee Titans.

Week 14: at Tennessee Titans

Trying to rebound from back-to-back home losses, the Browns flew to LP Field for a Week 14 duel with the Tennessee Titans.  Cleveland struck first in the opening quarter as kicker Phil Dawson got a 47-yard and a 41-yard field goal.  The Titans took the lead in the second quarter, as QB Kerry Collins completed a 28-yard touchdown pass to FB Ahmard Hall, along with RB LenDale White got a 3-yard touchdown run.  Tennessee would increase its lead in the third quarter as Collins completed a 9-yard touchdown to wide receiver Justin Gage.  In the fourth quarter, the Browns to rally as Dawson nailed a 39-yard field goal, yet the Titans pulled away as RB Chris Johnson got a 25-yard touchdown run.

With the loss, Cleveland fell to 4–9.

Week 15: at Philadelphia Eagles

Coming off three straight losses without a touchdown, the Cleveland Browns sought to go 3–0 on Monday Night games, this time on the road against the Philadelphia Eagles. The Eagles struck first with a touchdown pass to WR Kevin Curtis. Both teams also traded field goals in the first quarter. CB Asante Samuel extended the Eagles' lead in the second quarter with an interception return for a touchdown, and K David Akers added a field goal in the third quarter. Cleveland could not answer, but DB Brandon McDonald scored the first touchdown for the Browns in 4 games with an interception return in the fourth quarter. This game saw the Browns extend their offensive troubles, going 16 quarters without an offensive touchdown.

With the loss, the Browns fell to 4–10, the third time in four years under Romeo Crennel that the Browns have had double-digit losses.

Week 16: vs. Cincinnati Bengals

Coming off four straight losses in which their offense failed to score a touchdown, the Cleveland Browns played their final home game of the season in near-zero wind chills against the Cincinnati Bengals. The Bengals scored first, with CB Leon Hall intercepting a Ken Dorsey pass and returning it 50 yards for a touchdown in the first quarter. WR Chris Henry completed the scoring by adding on a 20-yard touchdown reception in the second quarter. The shutout marked five straight games in which Cleveland's offense couldn't find the end zone. The only bright spot for the Browns was RB Jamal Lewis, who became the 24th NFL player to reach 10,000 career rushing yards.

With the loss, the Browns fell to 4–11, and ended the season 1–7 at home.

Week 17: at Pittsburgh Steelers

Coming off five straight losses without a touchdown on offense, the Cleveland Browns closed out the regular season at Heinz Field in a Week 17 AFC North rematch with their hated rival, the Pittsburgh Steelers. The Steelers put up two touchdowns in the second quarter, a 34-yard run by RB Willie Parker and an 8-yard scramble by QB Byron Leftwich. The Steelers added 17 points in the second half (22-yard Jeff Reed field goal, 3-yard Gary Russell touchdown run, and a 32-yard interception TD return by Tyrone Carter), but they were unnecessary as the Browns were incapable of scoring at all, marking six straight games in which the offense couldn't score a touchdown (an NFL record 24 quarters). Again, the only good news for the Browns was RB Jamal Lewis, who topped 1,000 rushing yards this season.  He would become the first Browns running back since Mike Pruitt in 1980 & 1981 to have back-to-back 1,000-yard rushing seasons.

With the loss, the Browns ended their season at 4–12, with a record of 3–5 away from home.  This also marked the Browns' eleventh straight loss to the Steelers. Also, it set off an 11 season losing streak lasting for more than a decade (as of 2018).

Savage and Crennel fired
After the game, it was announced that GM Phil Savage was fired.  One day later, head coach Romeo Crennel would also be released after the Browns ended their season at 4–12, at the bottom of the AFC North.

2009 Pro Bowl
Despite the disappointing performance by the team, LT Joe Thomas, DT Shaun Rogers, and LS Ryan Pontbriand were recognized for individual accomplishments as they were named to the AFC roster for the 2009 Pro Bowl.  Thomas and Rogers were selected by the pro-bowl voters., and Pontbriand was selected as a "need" player by the Baltimore Ravens coaching staff, who will be coaching the AFC squad.

KR Josh Cribbs was named a first alternate, K Phil Dawson a second alternate, and LG Eric Steinbach and LB D'Qwell Jackson were named third alternates at their respective positions.

References

External links 
 2008 Cleveland Browns at Pro Football Reference (Profootballreference.com)
 2008 Cleveland Browns Statistics at jt-sw.com
 2008 Cleveland Browns Schedule at jt-sw.com
 2008 Cleveland Browns at DatabaseFootball.com  

Cleveland Browns seasons
Cleveland
Cleveland